Mystic Steamship Company, also known a Boston Tow Boat Company was a Boston, Massachusetts shipping company. Named after the Mystic River. The company was founded in 1854 as the T-Wharf Towing Company. Boston Tow Boat Company was an operator of ship salvaging, icebreaker shipping, and a tugboat operator. The other major operation was transporting coal. Mystic Steamship Company operated collier ships and coal barges. Coal was load at Newport News, Virginia and delivery to New York Harbor, Philadelphia and Baltimore. Mystic Steamship Company was also a bulk grain transporter. Eastern Gas & Fuel Associates purchased and ran Mystic Steamship Company.  Eastern Gas & Fuel Associates is now Eastern Enterprises.  T-Wharf Towing Company merged into the Boston Gas Eastern Enterprises Incorporated, its parent company on June 30, 1917. Boston Gas Eastern Enterprises reformed the shipping lines as the Boston Towboat Company Incorporated. Boston Fuel Transportation Company purchased Boston Towboat Company in 1985. Boston Fuel renamed the company the Boston Towing and Transportation Companies.  In 1940, the company became the Mystic Steamship, a Division of Eastern Gas and Fuel Associates.

During World War I Mystic Steamship Company operated Merchant navy ships for the United States Shipping Board. During World War II Mystic Steamship Company was active with charter shipping with the Maritime Commission and War Shipping Administration.

Post Mystic Steamship purchased some World War surplus Liberty ships, both tankers and colliers types.

Ships
 Luna, tugboat, a City of Boston Landmark  
Venus,  tugboat 
Trojan tug 
Biwabik, ship
Brandon, ship 
Admiral Clark, ship 
Brockton, 1908 Steamboat
Arlington 1910 Steamboat

Liberty ships
SS Winchester, ship 
 Sewanee Seam  
 Sewell Seam 
 Beckley Seam  
 Pittsburgh Seam 
 Jewell Seam   
 Jellico Seam 
 Mingo Seam  
 Roda Seam  

World  War II
 
SS Melrose, collier, Coal cargo 7200 tons, bunkers 800 tons, crew of 3
Liberty ships
 Jagger Seam 
 Hadley F. Brown 
 William Pierce Frye  
 Sumner I. Kimball

See also
World War II United States Merchant Navy

External links

Tugboat Luna Preservation Society
 City of Boston, Landmarks Commission. Tugboat Luna Study Report, 1985

References

Transport companies established in 1854
Defunct shipping companies of the United States
1985 disestablishments in the United States
Transport companies disestablished in 1985